Deh Rash-e Bazan (also Romanized as Deh Rash-e Bāzān; also known as Deh Rash) is a village in Bazan Rural District, in the Central District of Javanrud County, Kermanshah Province, Iran. At the 2006 census, its population was 66, in 10 families.

References 

Populated places in Javanrud County